Darroch is a surname. Notable people with the surname include:

 Arnold Darroch (1898–1974), Canadian politician
 Bob Darroch (born 1940), New Zealand illustrator, author and cartoonist 
 Jenny Darroch (born 1963), dean of the Drucker School of Management, Claremont Graduate University, California
 Jeremy Darroch (born 1962), British businessman
 Joe Darroch (1872–1949), Scottish footballer
 Kim Darroch (born 1954), British diplomat
 Malcolm Darroch (born 1938), Scottish footballer